Monterey Township is one of the fifteen townships of Putnam County, Ohio, United States.  The 2000 census found 2,056 people in the township, 1,183 of whom lived in the unincorporated portions of the township. Monterrey Township at the 2000 census had 83.6% of its inhabitants are reported to be German Americans, the highest number in the United States.

Geography
Located in the far western part of the county, it borders the following townships:
Jackson Township - northeast
Jennings Township - southeast
Washington Township, Van Wert County - southwest
Jackson Township, Van Wert County - west
Washington Township, Paulding County - northwest

The village of Ottoville is located in eastern Monterey Township.

Name and history
Monterey Township was organized in 1849. It is the only Monterey Township statewide.

Government
The township is governed by a three-member board of trustees, who are elected in November of odd-numbered years to a four-year term beginning on the following January 1. Two are elected in the year after the presidential election and one is elected in the year before it. There is also an elected township fiscal officer, who serves a four-year term beginning on April 1 of the year after the election, which is held in November of the year before the presidential election. Vacancies in the fiscal officership or on the board of trustees are filled by the remaining trustees.

References

External links
County website

Townships in Putnam County, Ohio
Townships in Ohio